Pluriformea is a proposed sibling clade of the Filozoa, and consists of Syssomonas multiformis and the Corallochytrea. Together with the Ichthyosporea they form the Holozoa.

An up to date cladogram is

The alternative hypotheses is the Teretosporea clade.

References 

Holozoa